Abbas Nshimirimana (born 19 May 1998) is a Burundian professional footballer, who plays as a midfielder for Guêpiers du Lac.

International career

International goals
Scores and results list Burundi's goal tally first.

References

External links 
 
 

1993 births
Living people
Burundian footballers
Burundi international footballers
Association football midfielders